Origin Suite is the second jazz album by Michael Waldrop, produced by award-winning Seattle, Washington-based label Origin Records and released January 3, 2018. The CD idea is a high level, eclectic mix of works showcasing Michael Waldrop. Specifically, the Origin Suite was composed for this CD as a tour de force to showcase Waldrop. Most notably the CD received 4 of 5 stars by music critic and author Brian Morton in the April 2018 edition of Jazz Journal from London.

Background 

After the success of Michael Waldrop's Time Within Itself CD, he decided to approach Origin Records to do a second CD. They agreed and this time a wider set of music was used though still employing Jack Cooper as the primary writer and arranger for the new project. Another substantial grant ($10,000) was obtained by Waldrop from Eastern Washington University to doing a CD.

The Origin Suite (title work) is inspired by three paintings by artist Wifredo Lam: La Jungla, Nativité, Al Final De La Noche. Lam's paintings are primitive and earthy in approach and draw on Caribbean and Central African themes related to Santería and Cuban Vodú culture.

Promotion 
The Origin Suite CD got its first promotion with the "Track of The Day" feature with All About Jazz. The track La Jungla was given 3.5 of 5 stars by reviewer Fiona Ord-Shrimpton.

Reception 

Reviewing for Cadence, Bob Rausch said: "Michael Waldrop [drm/vib] is another artist with past ties to North Texas State and his big band is not traditional as displayed on ORIGIN SUITE. Recorded at various times from August 2010 though July 2017 presented here are a dozen originals mostly by Waldrop. There are also moments for small groupings. Purists will be set off by the lack of continuity in style and manner of the CD, that said, the various styles employed work well. The main influence seems to be Weather Report with its high energy rhythm and electrified pinning. Waldrop picks from a pool of over 25 musicians, uses overdubbing and there is an occasionally use of voice as sweetening to the compositions."

Tom Hull was less impressed, saying Waldrop "runs a big band here, with various bits recorded elsewhere and tacked together. The title suite is rather short, but the album goes on and on, alternately richly expressive and overblown."

Track listing 

Recording notes
 January 11, 2016 (tracks 1, 2, 3, 5, 6 and 8), Crystal Clear Sound, Dallas, TX
 Summer 2016 (track 7), Buffalo Sound, Denton, TX
 June 2016 (tracks 4 and 10), SkyMuse Studios, Seattle, WA
 September 2016 (tracks 9 and 11), Ice Station Zebra, Seattle, WA
 August 2010 (track 12), KillZone Studios, Los Angeles, CA

Personnel

Musicians 

Michael Waldrop (all tracks): Drums and Vibraphone (add congas and keyboards for track 11)

Tracks 1, 2, 3, 5, 6, 8
Jack Cooper: MD/conductor, arranger, composer
Marc Secara (1-3, 5): Vocal
Jimi Tunnell (1-3): Guitar/Vocal
Will Campbell: Alto Saxophone/flute/clarinet/soprano sax 
Tim Ishii: Alto Saxophone/flute/clarinet
Mario Cruz: Tenor Saxophone/clarinet 
Chris McGuire: Tenor Saxophone/clarinet 
Paul Baker: Baritone Saxophone/bass clarinet 
Keith Jourdan (lead), David Spencer, Larry Spencer, Mike Steinel: Trumpet and flugelhorn 
Anthony Williams (lead), Tony Baker, Greg Waits, John Wasson (bass): Trombone 
Noel Johnstone: Guitar 
Piano: Steve Snyder
Lynn Seaton (5, 6 and 8): Acoustic bass
Jeff Plant (1-3): Electric bass  
José Rossy: percussion

Track 7
Scott Kinsey: Keyboards
 Jeff Plant: Electric bass
Jimi Tunnell (1-3): Guitar/Vocal
Mario Cruz: Tenor Saxophone
José Rossy: percussion

Tracks 9, 11
Alto Saxophone/soprano sax: Travis Ranney
Richard Cole: Tenor Saxophone/baritone Saxophone 
Stephen Friel (11): Baritone Saxophone
Brad Allison (9), Keith Jordan (11): Trumpet/flugelhorn
Dan Marcus (9), Scott Whitfield (11): Trombone
Brian Monroney: Guitar
John Hansen (9): Piano
Barry Aiken (11): Keyboards
Rick White (11): Bass
Brad Dutz (9): Percussion

Tracks 4, 10
Larry Panella: Flutes
Brad Dutz: Percussion
John Hansen: Piano
Scott Steed (10): Acoustic bass
Chris Symer (4): Bass

Track 12
Wayne Peet: Piano
Brad Dutz: Percussion
Joel Hamilton: Bass

Production 

John Bishop: Executive Producer 
Michael Waldrop: Producer 
Tim Reppert: Associate Producer  
Kent Stump, Jimi Tunnell, Michael Lewis, Dave Dysart, Steve Gamberoni, Paul Nowell, Anthony Panella, Wentoa Xing: Recording engineers
Tim Reppert: Editing and mix engineer (Soundtrack Studios, Boston and REP Studio, Ithaca, NY.)   
Scott Kinsey: Mastering 
Michael Waldrop: Liner notes
John Bishop: Cover design and layout  
Daniel Pardo and Ivana Cojbasic: Liner photographs:

Charts

Release history

See also
Origin Records
Michael Waldrop
Jack Cooper
Marc Secara
List of jazz arrangers

References

External links

Origin Suite at Origin Records

Michael Waldrop's website

Jazz albums by American artists
2018 albums
Big band albums
Instrumental albums